Somalia Water and Land Information Management Project (SWALIM) is a land management organization in Somalia. It is managed by the Food and Agriculture Organization and funded by the European Union.

External links
Official site

Environmental organisations based in Somalia